Lakiya, or Laqye is a Bedouin town (local council) in the Southern District of Israel.

History
Lakiya was founded in 1985 as part of a government project to settle Bedouins in permanent settlements. It is one of the seven original government-planned Bedouin townships in the Negev desert.

In December 2009, the town was ranked lowest (1 out of 10) in socio-economic standing, with an average income of 4,360 shekels compared to the national average of 7,070. Only 58.2% of grade twelve students are eligible to graduate from high school.

In 1999 the first local council elections were held, with Sheikh Ibrahim Abu Maharab elected as council head. Abu Maharab was later succeeded by Khaled al-Sana.

Since 2016, the Trans-Israel Highway 6 serves Lakiya, connecting the town to Highway 6 through both the Lakiya Interchange and Shoket Interchange.

Demographics
According to the Israel Central Bureau of Statistics (CBS), the population of Lakiya was 9,943 in December 2010 (7,600 in December 2004). Its annual growth rate is 3.1%. Lakiya's jurisdiction is 5,728 dunams (5.7 km²).

There are several Bedouin clans residing in Lakiya, al-Sana being the largest among them. Other families are: Al-Assad, Abu Ammar and Abu Maharab. Some clans don't live inside Lakiya, but on adjacent territory.

Economy
In 2013, Arab-Bedouin women from Lakiya and other Bedouin towns participated in a sewing course for fashion design at the Amal College in Beer Sheva, including lessons on sewing and cutting, personal empowerment and business initiatives.

Weaving and embroidery projects

The Lakiya Negev Weaving Project was founded in 1991, its aim is to empower Negev Bedouin women by applying their traditional weaving skills to the manufacture and sale of woven products. It is based completely on the unique Bedouin heritage passed on from mother to daughter. Approximately 130 Bedouin women are involved in this project in all the stages of the production from initial wool treatment, weaving the rugs, cushion covers and pouches, and selling. These women were provided guidance, professional consulting and hands-on assistance in the fields of marketing, branding, sales, the business's organizational structure and business plan, fundraising and networking. The project's aim was to make it a successful, profitable and financially independent cooperative business. It is about to succeed - several retailers and chains sell Bedouin traditional ground-looms all over Israel, including Haifa, and also abroad. A new visitors' center will be open soon but it has already become a tourist site.

Another tourist site is the Desert Embroidery Project. Some 20 women completed their professional entrepreneurial and business training and guidance and initiated a project based on the design and production of the traditional Bedouin costume jewelry. They are producing this embroidery at home with traditional Bedouin motifs and decorations. The women also hold Bedouin embroidery workshops and events based on the Bedouin tradition. Their workshop is also a visitors' center and it is a famous tourist attraction in the area.

Healthcare
There are branches of several health funds (medical clinics) in Lakiya: Leumit, Clalit and several Tipat Halav well baby clinics .

Education and culture
There are a number of schools in the township and a communal activity center.

Notable people

 Ismael Abu-Saad, professor of education, Ben-Gurion University of the Negev
 Amal Elsana Alh'jooj, spokesperson for the Bedouin women, co-executive director of the Negev Institute for Strategies of Peace and Development (NISPED), a founding director of the Arab-Jewish Center for Equality, Empowerment and Cooperation (AJEEC); a member of Prime Minister's Commission for Economic Development of the Arab Sector. She established the first Arab Bedouin women's organization to improve the situation of Bedouin women at the age of 17.
 Roz Willey as-Sana, Bedouin Weaving project coordinator
 Taleb el-Sana, an Israeli politician, the longest serving Arab member of the Knesset

See also
 Arab localities in Israel

References

External links
 Lakiya Negev Weaving - website of one of Lakiya's main businesses
 Lands of the Negev, a short film presented by Israel Land Administration describing the challenges faced in providing land management and infrastructure to the Bedouins in Israel's southern Negev region

Bedouin localities in Israel
Arab localities in Israel
Local councils in Southern District (Israel)
Populated places in Southern District (Israel)
1982 establishments in Israel